Cherokee is a Unicode block containing the syllabic characters for writing the Cherokee language.
When Cherokee was first added to Unicode in version 3.0 it was treated as a unicameral alphabet, but in version 8.0 it was redefined as a bicameral script. The Cherokee block (U+13A0 to U+13FF) contains all the uppercase letters plus six lowercase letters. The Cherokee Supplement block (U+AB70 to U+ABBF), added in version 8.0, contains the rest of the lowercase letters. For backwards compatibility, the Unicode case folding algorithm—which usually converts a string to lowercase characters—maps Cherokee characters to uppercase.

History
The following Unicode-related documents record the purpose and process of defining specific characters in the Cherokee block:

References 

Character encoding
Cherokee language
Digital typography
Unicode blocks